Birger Sevaldson (born 1953, Bærum, Norway) is a founding member and current chairman of OCEAN Design Research Association and Professor at the Institute of Industrial Design at AHO - Oslo School of Architecture and Design where he collaborates with Michael Ulrich Hensel. He is an academic and designer working in a broad field of design and architecture. He has been in private practice since 1986. His practice spans from architecture interior to furniture and product design, design of lighting armatures and boat design. It also includes installations.

Sevaldson has been developing concepts in design computing, digital creativity in design and architecture (Digital morphogenesis) and his doctoral thesis from 2005 is a summary of 15 years of research in this field. This research expanded into a wider interest in the design process and especially design processes for uncertainty, unforeseen futures and complexity. This research grew out of the digital research and initially engaged in time related design,  reformulating the design environment and resulted in an approach entitled Systems Oriented Design.

He has been lecturing and teaching in Norway, Europe, Asia and USA and has held a visiting professorship at NACD in Oslo and has been a visiting critic at Syracuse University School of Architecture, USA.

References

Selected publications
 Sevaldson, B. (2008). 'A System Approach to Design Learning'. Systemisches Denken und Integrales Entwerfen / System thinking and Integral Design. A. Menges. Offenbach, Präsident der Hochschule für Gestaltung Offenbach am Main.
 Sevaldson, B. (2008). 'Rich Research Space'. FORM akademisk 1(1).
 Sevaldson, B. (2005). Developing Digital Design Techniques. Doctoral thesis. Oslo, Oslo School of Architecture and Design.
 Sevaldson, B. (2004). 'Designing Time: A Laboratory for Time Based Design'. Future Ground, Melbourne, DRS 
 Sevaldson, B. (2001). 'The Renaissance of Visual Thinking'. Konference om Arkitekturforskning og IT.
 Sevaldson, B. (2001). 'Digitale Designstrategier'. Arkitekten 07: 2-7.
 Sevaldson, B. (2001). 'Computer Aided Design Techniques'. Nordic Journal of Architectural Research.
 Sevaldson, B. (2000). 'The Integrated Conglomerate Approach: A Suggestion for a Generic Model of Design Research'. Doctoral Education in Design, conference, La Clusaz, DRS.
 Sevaldson, B. (1999). 'Research on Digital Design Strategies'. Useful and Critical, the Position of Research in Design Conference. Helsinki.
 Sevaldson, B. (1999). 'Research Design in Design Research'. Cumulus Conference, Rome, Cumulus.
 Sevaldson, B. (1999). 'Dynamic Generative Diagrams'. eCAADe Conference, Weimar.

External links
 http://www.ocean-designresearch.net
 https://web.archive.org/web/20190924114140/https://aho.no/
 http://www.systemsorienteddesign.net
 https://web.archive.org/web/20180914220640/http://www.membranespaces.net/

Norwegian industrial designers
1953 births
Living people